"Coz I'm Free" is a song recorded by Christine Anu. It was released in April 2001 as the third and final single from her gold-selling, second studio album, Come My Way (2000). The song is inspired by Anu's hero Cathy Freeman. At a Mushroom Records press release, Anu said; "I met Cathy at the ARIA Music Awards a couple of years ago but it wasn’t until I saw her in Seville... that Coz I'm Free" came together. I watched her win the World Championships and then we caught up in London not long afterwards.... She's so inspiring—her focus, how hard she trains, all that she's achieved. When I watched the race in Seville, the camera zoomed in on her tattoo and I got the idea then for a song." The song peaked at number 86 on the ARIA Chart.

Track listings
 CD Single (MUSH020132)
 Coz I'm Free"	
 Coz I'm Free" (Illpickl's Other World Mix)	
 "Jump to Love" (Course & Morrison Mix (Edit)

Chart positions

References

2000 songs
2001 singles
Mushroom Records singles
Christine Anu songs
Songs written by Stuart Crichton
Songs written by Christine Anu